Ambika Bumb an American biomedical scientist and businessperson. Bumb is a nanomedicine specialist who uses nanotechnology for the detection of treatment of disease. Her discoveries using nanodiamonds while working as postdoctoral researcher at the National Cancer Institute and the National Heart, Lung, and Blood Institute led to the launch of the biotech Bikanta.

Early life 
Bumb was born to Indian Jain parents who immigrated to the United States for higher education. Her father was one of the earliest in his family to complete his Doctor of Philosophy degree and her mother the first female in her town to go to college. Her maternal-grandfather was a veterinarian. Bumb graduated as from Southside High School as valedictorian in 2002, where her younger sister and brother also followed her as valedictorians.

Education 
Bumb graduated in 2005 with a Bachelor of Science in Biomedical Engineering and a Minor in Economics from Georgia Institute of Technology, while being recognized with the Helen E. Grenga Outstanding Woman Engineer and E. Jo Baker President's Scholar Awards. With an early interest in nanomedicine, she conducted research focused on tracking quantum dots in bone and cartilage while also being an active leader in various campus organizations.

In 2008, Bumb completed her doctorate in Medical Engineering in three years from University of Oxford while also on the prestigious Marshall Scholarship and NIH-OxCam Program. Her doctoral work brought together 4 labs from 2 institutes, 4 fields, and 2 countries. She developed a triple-reporting nanoparticle and showed the technology's transferability across different disease types with studies in cancer and multiple sclerosis. The magnetic nanoparticles demonstrated strong potential in cancer diagnostics and therapy. Upon graduation, she continued to go on to two post-doctoral fellowships at the National Cancer Institute and National Heart, Lung and Blood Institute. She has received much recognition for excellence in engineering and was profiled early in her career in Nature as a successful young scientist on the fast-track.

Career 
Her breakthroughs in the areas of nanomedicine and diagnostics have led to multiple patents, publications, and the spin out of the biotech Bikanta that is using nanodiamonds to allow academics and doctors to study and address disease at the cellular level. Nanodiamonds are next generation imaging probes trailblazing cutting-edge research including applications with the recent Nobel Prize in Chemistry for super-resolved fluorescence microscopy and utility in portable cancer detection devices. Bikanta is one of the first biotechs to be funded by Y Combinator, winner of the Silicon Valley Boomer Venture and CapCon Competitions, a California Life Science Institute's FAST Awardee, and named 1 of 4 Best Diagnostics Startups of 2015 by QB3.

As Bikanta prepared to move the technology into clinical trials, the Theranos scandal went public and many investors pulled out of the diagnostics space. Bikanta was unable to raise the funding to proceed with the clinical trials.

Complementary to her scientific and commercial interests, Bumb has also been involved in national science policy initiatives, particularly related to nanotechnology. After Bikanta, Ambika began working as Health Science and Technology Advisor for the Secretary of State in the office of Crisis Management and Strategy in December 2019, where she played a role in the government response to the COVID-19 pandemic.

Bumb was featured as a female role model to empower young girls by Career Girls. She has been appreciated in various interviews, including by Nature at the Naturejobs Career Expo, San Francisco and in an interview by WeFunder.

Personal life 
Bumb practices Jainism and has been a dancer from an early age.

Awards and recognition 
 Marshall Scholarship
 The Council of Outstanding Young Engineering Alumni Award - Georgia Institute of Technology
 Orloff Science Award for Technical Achievement - National Institutes of Health
 National Institutes of Health-Oxford Cambridge Scholarship in Biomedical Sciences
 Georgia Institute of Technology President's Scholarship
 Aspen Health Forum Fellow
 Helen E. Grenga Outstanding Woman Engineer Award
 E. Jo Baker Award for outstanding President's Scholar
 Omicron Delta Kappa Award for Outstanding Leadership
 Women In Engineering Excellence Award
 Akamai Foundation Award through the Mathematical Association of America
 Winner of Silicon Valley Boomer Venture Summit
 Winner of CapCon Business Competition

References 

Living people
Marshall Scholars
Georgia Tech alumni
Businesspeople in the health care industry
Women medical researchers
American women chief executives
American Jains
American people of Indian descent
American women of Indian descent in health professions
Alumni of Oriel College, Oxford
Year of birth missing (living people)
American medical researchers
21st-century American businesswomen
21st-century American businesspeople
21st-century American women scientists
21st-century American biologists